5 October – 2014 Grozny bombing: a 19-year-old man named Opti Mudarov went to the town hall where an event was taking place to mark Grozny City Day celebrations coinciding with the birthday of Chechen President Ramzan Kadyrov. Police officers noticed him acting strangely and stopped him. The officers began to search him and the bomb which Mudarov had been carrying exploded. Five officers, along with the suicide bomber, were killed, while 12 others were wounded.
 4 December – 2014 Grozny clashes: a group of armed militants of the Caucasus Emirate attacked a traffic police checkpoint outside the city of Grozny.

See also
List of clashes in the North Caucasus in 2009
List of clashes in the North Caucasus in 2011
List of clashes in the North Caucasus in 2012
List of clashes in the North Caucasus in 2015
List of clashes in the North Caucasus in 2016
List of clashes in the North Caucasus in 2017
List of clashes in the North Caucasus in 2018
List of clashes in the North Caucasus in 2019

References

Clashes in the North Caucasus
Clashes in the North Caucasus
North Caucasus
Lists of clashes in the North Caucasus
Lists of armed conflicts in 2014